The Czech Republic's Barbora Krejčíková and Kateřina Siniaková defeated Switzerland's Belinda Bencic and Viktorija Golubic in the final, 7–5, 6–1 to win the gold medal in Women's Doubles tennis at the 2020 Summer Olympics. It was the Czech Republic's first victory in women's doubles, and its third consecutive medal. In the bronze-medal match, Brazil's Laura Pigossi and Luisa Stefani defeated Veronika Kudermetova and Elena Vesnina of the Russian Olympic Committee, 4–6, 6–4, [11–9]. It was Brazil's first Olympic tennis medal.

Ekaterina Makarova and Vesnina were the reigning gold medalists from 2016, but Makarova retired from tennis in 2020. Vesnina attempted to defend the title with Kudermetova, but they lost in the semifinals.

The competition was a single-elimination tournament with a bronze-medal match. Matches were best-of-3 sets, except that the third set is a match tiebreak (first to 10 points) instead of a typical set. A tiebreak was played if one of the first two sets reaches 6–6.

This tournament marked the final appearance of former world No. 4 Kiki Bertens of the Netherlands before her retirement. She partnered with Demi Schuurs; they lost in the second round to Kudermetova and Vesnina.

Schedule
The competition was held over nine days from 24 July to 1 August. Times given were the start of tennis sessions, though the women's doubles shared courts with other tennis events.

All times are Japan Standard Time (UTC+9)

Seeds

  /  (champions, gold medalists)
  /  (first round)
  /  (second round)
  /  (quarterfinals)
  /  (first round)
  /  (quarterfinals)
  /  (first round)
  /  (first round)

Draw

Finals

Top half

Bottom half

See also
Krejčíková–Siniaková doubles team

References

External links
Draw 

2020
Women's Doubles
Women's events at the 2020 Summer Olympics